Rolled Steel Products (Holdings) Ltd v British Steel Corp [1986] Ch 246 is a UK company law case, concerning the enforceability of obligations against a company.  The case was one of the last significant cases on ultra vires under English company law before the provisions abrogating that doctrine in the Companies Act 1985 became effective.

Facts
Rolled Steel Products Ltd gave security to guarantee the debts of a company called SSS Ltd to British Steel Corporation. This was a purpose that did not benefit Rolled Steel Products Ltd. Moreover, Rolled Steel's director, Mr Shenkman was interested in SSS Ltd (he had personally guaranteed a debt to British Steel’s subsidiary Colvilles, which SSS Ltd owed money to). The company was empowered to grant guarantees under its articles but approval of the deal was irregular because Mr Shenkman's personal interest meant his vote should not have counted for the quorum at the meeting approving the guarantee. The shareholders knew of the irregularity, and so did British Steel. Rolled Steel Products wanted to get out of the guarantee, and was arguing it was unenforceable either because it was ultra vires, or because the guarantee had been created without proper authority.

At first instance Vinelott J held British Steel’s knowledge of the irregularity rendered the guarantee ultra vires, void and incapable of validation with the members’ consent. British Steel appealed.

Judgment
The Court of Appeal held that the transaction was not ultra vires and void. Simply because a transaction is entered for an improper purpose does not make it ultra vires. He emphasised the distinction between an act which is entered into for an improper purpose (which is not beyond the capacity of a company, or void) and an act which is wholly outside a company's objects (and hence ultra vires and void). However, it was unenforceable because British Steel, with knowledge of the irregularity, could not rely on a presumption of regularity in the company’s internal management. Since British Steel ‘constructively knew’ about the lack of authority, they could acquire no rights under the guarantee. On ultra vires Browne-Wilkinson LJ said the following.

On the question of authority Slade LJ held that the Rule in Turquand's case, which would ordinarily entitle a person dealing with a company who to assume the company's own internal rules were complied with, did not apply when it came to someone breaching a rule to further their own personal interests.

See also

 UK company law
 Capacity in English law
 Agency in English law
 First EU Company Law Directive 68/151/EEC
 Hartog v Colin & Shields [1939] 3 All ER 566
 Howard v Patent Ivory Manufacturing Co (1888) 38 Ch D 156
 Morris v Kanssen [1946] AC 459, a presumption of irregularity cannot be relied on by company officers

Notes

References
 L Sealy and S Worthington, Cases and Materials on Company Law (9th edn OUP 2010) 95, 119

United Kingdom company case law
Court of Appeal (England and Wales) cases
1986 in case law
1986 in British law
Steel industry of the United Kingdom